Ferganasaurus (meaning "Fergana Valley lizard") was a genus of dinosaur first formally described in 2003 by Alifanov and Averianov. The type species is Ferganasaurus verzilini. It was a sauropod similar to Rhoetosaurus. Ferganasaurus is known exclusively from the Balabansai Formation of Kyrgyzstan, which dates to the Callovian stage of the Middle Jurassic.

Discovery and naming
The holotype, PIN N 3042/1 (two dorsal and sixteen caudal vertebrae, a pelvis and limb bones), was discovered in 1966 by Kurzanov and Rhozdestvensky in Middle Jurassic (Callovian)-aged rocks from the Balabansai Formation, Kyrgyzstan, but it was subsequently lost with only drawings of the holotype remaining. A 2000 expedition into the Balabansai Formaiton yielded a second specimen of Ferganasaurus, but despite this new material, and the drawings of the originals, no cranial material has ever been attributed to Ferganasaurus. In 2003, the species Freganasaurus verzilini was described by Alifanov & Averianov.

Description

References

External links 
 https://web.archive.org/web/20050830082006/http://palaeo.gly.bris.ac.uk/dinobase/Yrs2000.html
 https://web.archive.org/web/20070928020945/http://www.courier.com.ru/priroda/pr1003new_31.htm

Sauropods
Middle Jurassic dinosaurs of Asia
Callovian life
Fossils of Kyrgyzstan
Fossil taxa described in 2003